Hans Olof Holmström (15 October 1784 - 27 August 1855) was a Swedish bishop within the Church of Sweden. He was the archbishop of Uppsala between 1852 and 1855.

Biography
He  was born in the parish of Ösmo, Sweden, the son of Stefan Holmström and Engel Risberg.
Holmström had received a master's degree at Uppsala University in 1806 and three years later was appointed associate professor of Latin in 1811 and in 1816 became an associate professor of the Faculty of Philosophy. He was appointed vicar of Dunker-Lilla Malma parish in 1828. He was appointed bishop of the  Diocese of Strängnäs  in 1839 and held this office until 1852, when he was called to serve as archbishop of Uppsala and vice chancellor of the University of Uppsala.

References 

 

1784 births
1855 deaths
People from Nynäshamn Municipality
Uppsala University alumni
Lutheran archbishops of Uppsala